Théo Vimpère (born 3 July 1990 in Limoges) is a French racing cyclist, who last rode for French amateur team Pro Immo Nicolas Roux.

Major results

2011
 1st Stage 1 Tour d'Eure-et-Loir
2013
 1st  Mountains classification Tour Méditerranéen
 1st  Points classification Tour du Limousin
2014
 7th Tour du Doubs
 10th Overall Tour du Gévaudan Languedoc-Roussillon
2015
 7th Overall Tour de l'Ain
 9th Cholet-Pays de Loire
2016
 7th Overall Tour du Limousin
2017
 1st Stage 2a Tour de Guadeloupe

References

External links

1990 births
Living people
French male cyclists
Sportspeople from Limoges
Cyclists from Nouvelle-Aquitaine